Saleem Iqbal Shervani (born 22 March 1953) is an Indian politician from the Samajwadi Party.

Career
He represented Badaun constituency in Uttar Pradesh, in the 8th, 11th, 12th, 13th and 14th Lok Sabhas. A close ally of Rajiv Gandhi, he was the Union Minister of State for Health and Family Welfare from 1996 to 1997 and the Union Minister of State for External Affairs from 1997 to 1998 in the government led by the prime minister I.K. Gujral.

After the death of Indira Gandhi, Rajiv Gandhi insisted that he should fight the elections. Eventually the Badayun constituency was identified for him, and he won several elections there.

In the wake of the Babri Masjid demolition, Salim Sherwani left Congress to join Samajwadi Party. However, in the Indian general election in Uttar Pradesh, 2009, Samajwadi Party denied him a ticket in order to accommodate Mulayam Singh Yadav's nephew Dharmendra Yadav. Shervani then re-joined the Congress. He fought the election from Badayun against mafia don DP Yadav (Bahujan Samaj Party) but came third, losing to Dharmendra Yadav by 40 thousand votes.

Positions held
Saleem Iqbal Shervani has been elected 5 times as Lok Sabha MP.

References

External links 
 Official Website

Indian Muslims
Politicians from Allahabad
Living people
Samajwadi Party politicians
Indian National Congress politicians from Uttar Pradesh
1953 births
India MPs 1984–1989
India MPs 1996–1997
India MPs 1998–1999
India MPs 1999–2004
India MPs 2004–2009
Lok Sabha members from Uttar Pradesh
United Progressive Alliance candidates in the 2014 Indian general election
People from Budaun district